Doug Sewall is an American wheelchair curler.

Teams

References

External links 

Living people
American male curlers
American wheelchair curlers
American wheelchair curling champions
Year of birth missing (living people)